Károly Németh (born 31 August 1970) is a Hungarian table tennis player. He placed 17th in the men's singles event at the 1996 Summer Olympics.

References

1970 births
Living people
Hungarian male table tennis players
Olympic table tennis players of Hungary
Table tennis players at the 1996 Summer Olympics
Table tennis players from Budapest
20th-century Hungarian people